is a railway station located in the city of  Gifu, Gifu Prefecture, Japan, operated by the private railway operator Meitetsu.

Lines

Station layout

Kanō Station has a ground-level island platform serving two tracks. The platform is connected to the station building by a level crossing. The station is unattended.

Platforms

Services

Adjacent stations

History
It was renamed Kanō Station on January 10, 1959.

Surrounding area
The station is located in a residential area.

See also
 List of Railway Stations in Japan

References

External links

  

Railway stations in Japan opened in 1914
Stations of Nagoya Railroad
Railway stations in Gifu Prefecture